The Golden Tour was the fifteenth concert tour by Australian recording artist Kylie Minogue. It was launched in support of her fourteenth studio album, Golden (2018) and visited Europe and Australia. It began on 18 September 2018 in Newcastle, England at the Metro Radio Arena and concluded on 17 March 2019 in Mount Cotton, Australia at Sirromet Wines. The tour was first announced in February 2018, consisting of dates in the UK and Ireland. The previously announced European leg was incorporated into the tour in September of the same year, and the Australian leg was announced in November.

The concerts were divided into seven distinct sections: Desert Sunrise, The High & Dry, Nothing Behind Me, Everything Ahead of Me, The Lovers United, At the Picnic After the Biker Rally, New York City and an encore, The Nashville Rider. An interval halfway through the show separated the concert into two halves. Acting as creative director alongside Rob Sinclair, Minogue created a show narrative that was set in the 1970s and heavily influenced by Western films, featuring an abstract road movie which was presented on a large video screen. The retro influence of the concerts were also amplified by a "g"-shaped stage with a glittered runway. The tour received acclaim from music critics, who praised the shows for their simplicity in comparison to Minogue's previous tours.

The Golden Tour was also commercially successful. According to Billboard, the three concerts in London, England at The O2 Arena grossed $3,368,900 with 30,100 tickets sold, placing her at eighth spot for the biggest concerts of September 2018. Footage from the tour was also filmed across several nights, and was released on 6 December 2019 as Golden Live in Concert.

Background

In February 2018, Minogue announced a series of concerts in smaller venues as part of the Kylie Presents Golden tour, to coincide with the expected release of the album. Later the same month, a new arena tour was announced  with UK and Ireland dates being confirmed. Discussing the development process of the tour, Minogue stated:

In an interview on Good Morning Britain, Minogue explained that the shows would be split into "two halves", with an interval and a narrative throughout. She continued to say the setlist was mostly concrete at that point, mentioning "Raining Glitter" and "Lost Without You" as definite performances. Minogue's costumes for the tour were designed by Ralph & Russo, Kolchagov Barba,  Paco Rabanne, Jitrois, Stevie Stewart and Wrangler.

Shortly before the tour commenced in September, Sonic Yootha were announced as the support act for the UK and Ireland dates, and the previously announced European dates of the Kylie Presents Golden promotional tour would be incorporated into the Golden Tour. On 7 November, Minogue announced six Australian dates for the Golden Tour, three of which were part of the "A Day on the Green" festival.

Synopsis 
The first act of the show Desert Sunrise opened with a guitar instrumental and a howling wind sound effect, showing a projection of a desert at night. A troupe of dancers in cowboy outfits walked onto the stage as the sun began to rise, before Minogue rose out of the floor sat atop of a stack of luggage, singing "Golden". Lights brightened to reveal the "g"-shaped staging and a "glittering golden runway", and Minogue then performed "Get Outta My Way" and "Better the Devil You Know". "One Last Kiss" was performed at the opening night in Newcastle, but removed from the set list after.

The second section The High & Dry began with an interlude of "Blue Velvet", with the video screen showing Minogue singing the song at a bar. She emerged, dressed in an all-white ensemble, to continue the rest of the song. Minogue then performed "Confide in Me" and "I Believe in You", in place of "Breathe" (performed only at Newcastle). A short a cappella of "Where the Wild Roses Grow" was then performed as Minogue passes a rose through the crowd to the back of the venue, followed by "In Your Eyes". The second act concluded with a performance of "A Lifetime to Repair", with the singer stood atop of a pool table surrounded by her dancers.

The third section Nothing Behind Me, Everything Ahead of Me began with a performance of "Shelby '68" and "Radio On", with Minogue explaining the backstory behind both songs to the audience. A rendition of "Wow" was then performed, followed by a mash-up of "Can't Get You Out of My Head" and "The Chain". During this, Minogue wore a bespoke denim jacket, with an image of her and the name of the city being performed in embroidered into the back. A telephone box prop near the stage ramp began to ring and the lights dimmed, indicating the start of the twenty-minute interval. During which, a giant silver disco ball illuminated the venue.

After the interval, the dancers rose from the stage atop of illuminated motorcycles and Minogue appeared at the top of the stage ramp. She performed "Slow", starting the fourth section of the show, At the Biker Rally. Minogue and her backing vocalists then went on to perform "Kids", before the lights were dimmed and a rendition of "The One" was performed. Minogue then sang "Stop Me from Falling", where the section concluded.

The fifth section, At the Picnic After the Biker Rally, began with a medley of "Wouldn't Change a Thing" and "I'll Still Be Loving You", where Minogue performed whilst moving around the stage with a male dancer, followed by "Especially for You". She then performed "Lost Without You", complete with a laser show, and "All the Lovers". The section finished with the conclusion of this song, following the use of rainbow coloured lights and multiple confetti drops.

The video screens then displayed the logo of the penultimate "Studio 54" section, with Minogue entering through the stage doors wearing a bespoke golden dress, featuring 120,000 Preciosa crystals. She performed a medley consisting of then-unreleased song "New York City", "Raining Glitter" and "On a Night Like This". A chugging steam train sound effect then followed, as Minogue performed a disco rendition of "The Loco-Motion". Concluding the section, "Spinning Around" was performed, with golden ribbons fired across the audience.

Minogue then thanked the audience and vacated the stage with her dancers, as the lights dimmed. The video screen showed a blue, sparkling background before Minogue reappeared and began the encore of the show, The Nashville Rider, performing "Love at First Sight". Minogue then performed an extended version of the album's lead single, "Dancing", and concluded the show by thanking her team and audience and exiting through the stage doors.

Critical reception
The tour has gained acclaim from music critics. Simon Duke from The Evening Chronicle gave the opening night in Newcastle five stars with a positive review, saying that "Kylie dazzled in front of a set with visuals that looked like they’d been lifted straight from a picture perfect postcard of the Wild West". Duke stated that the "well executed and deliciously camp choreography [...] is a must see", being one of the best pop shows "ever experienced".

Adrian Caffery from The Birmingham Mail gave the Birmingham date 4 stars, stating that it was a "rollercoaster concert showcasing 30 years of Kylie [that] failed to disappoint", yet noted "there was a lot less spectacle than in previous Kylie concerts, with the extravagant stages [...] replaced by giant video screens." He concluded that "Kylie turned 50 this year, and on this evidence it’s clear she still has the Midas' touch."

Jack Hardwick from The Daily Star stated that "the pint-sized singer looked hotter than ever as she belted out some of her biggest hits" whilst "wowing fans with her killer vocals and [...] sex appeal. For the opening London date at The O2 Arena, Hardwick gave the show 4 stars, stating that Minogue "wowed fans with a stellar set-list of her biggest hits and a healthy smattering of new album tracks". He commented positively on the simplicity of the show, saying that "Kylie doesn’t need to rely on larger-than-life sets and jaw-dropping water spectacles to put on a killer show". Hardwick went on to praise Minogue's "faultless" vocals, concluding that "the show [was a]  nostalgic trip down memory lane [...] [with] disco classics in the form of On a Night Like This, The Loco-Motion, Spinning Around and Love at First Sight." Gemma Sandways of The Evening Standard reviewed the same show, giving it 4 stars and stating that "there was a healthy helping of glamour [...] from the glittering gowns to the giant disco ball and metallic streamers unleashed". She concluded by saying that the "performance served as a welcome reminder of Minogue’s generosity as a performer, and of the refreshing lack of cynicism with which she has always embraced all eras of her career".

Set list
This set list is representative of the 18 September 2018 show in Newcastle. It does not represent all dates of the tour.

 "Golden"
 "Get Outta My Way"
 "One Last Kiss"
 "Better the Devil You Know"
"Blue Velvet" (interlude)
 "Confide in Me"
 "Breathe"
 "Where the Wild Roses Grow"
 "In Your Eyes"
 "A Lifetime to Repair"
"Shelby '68"
 "Radio On"
 "Wow"
 "Can't Get You Out of My Head" 
"Slow" 
 "Kids"
 "The One"
 "Stop Me from Falling"
"Wouldn't Change a Thing" / "I'll Still Be Loving You"
 "Especially for You"
 "Lost Without You"
 "All the Lovers"
"New York City" / "Raining Glitter" / "On a Night Like This"
 "The Loco-Motion" 
 "Spinning Around"
Encore
"Love at First Sight" 
 "Dancing

Notes
 During the opening night in Newcastle, "Je ne sais pas pourquoi" was performed as an a cappella rendition. "One Last Kiss" was removed from the setlist after this show.
 During the show in Nottingham, "I Believe in You" was performed in place of "Breathe", and replaced it thereafter.
 During the show in Leeds, Minogue performed an impromptu rendition of 1988/2000 single of the Neighbours theme song.
For the Mainland European dates, "Get Outta My Way", "I Believe in You" and "Radio On" were not performed. The show was also reduced to five acts and an encore, with "In Your Eyes" and "A Lifetime to Repair" moved to act one, and "Shelby '68", "Wow" and "Can't Get You Out of My Head" added to act two.
 During the show in Paris, Minogue performed "2 Hearts" and "Your Disco Needs You", following audience requests during the encore.
 During the show in Vienna, Minogue performed "In My Arms" and "2 Hearts" as part of the encore.
 For the Ireland shows, Minogue performed "Let It Snow" as part of the encore.
 For the Australian dates, the November set list was performed with the inclusion of "Get Outta My Way".

Tour dates

Cancelled shows

Golden Live in Concert

Golden Live in Concert is the concert film of its corresponding tour. The film was recorded over various shows, and was released on 6 December 2019 in a 2CD and DVD format. The DVD contains the full live performance plus extra bonus features "We Are Golden" while the live album includes all audio tracks performed on the DVD footage.

The release of the DVD was announced on 7 October 2019 which coincided with the announcement of the extended repackage of "Step Back in Time: The Definitive Collection" and as a teaser for the DVD Minogue uploaded a video of the performance of "Lost Without You". On 18 October 2019 the performance of "Golden" was uploaded to Minogue's YouTube channel followed by the performance of "The Loco-Motion" which was uploaded on 5 December 2019. The DVD was released in two different formats: a digipack standard edition and a hardcover book deluxe edition which was available exclusively on her web store for a limited period of time.

A recording of the show aired on Channel 4 on Christmas Day 2019 following the broadcast of Minogue's television special, Kylie's Secret Night. This broadcast was edited into an hour-long special, featuring the following:

 "Golden"
 "Better the Devil You Know"
 "Confide in Me"
 "Wow"
 "Can't Get You Out of My Head"
 "Slow" / "Being Boiled"
 "Kids"
 "Stop Me from Falling"
 "All the Lovers"
 "The Loco-Motion"
 "Spinning Around"
 "Love at First Sight"
 "Dancing"

This broadcast was also shown on Channel 9 in Australasia on New Year's Eve, and was altered slightly to include behind the scenes interviews and footage.

Track listing

Charts

Personnel 
Adapted from the tour programme credits.

Production
 Kylie Minogue – creative director
 Rob Sinclair – creative director
 Steve Anderson – musical director
 Blue Leach – multi camera director
 Ashley Wallen – choreographer
 Rob Sinclair – production, lighting designer
 Tully Bloom  – personal assistant
 Christian Vermaak – hair and makeup
 Emma Banks – hair and makeup
 Chris Ibbs – hair and makeup
 Tony Evans – head of security

Band
 Christian Gulino – band leader, keyboards
 Tom Meadows – drums
 Luke Fitton – guitar
 Luke Higgins – guitar
 Jamie Sefton – bass
 Adetoun Anibi – backing vocals (all dates)
 Abbie Osmon – backing vocals (selected dates)
 Kirsten Joy - backing vocals (selected dates)
 Katie Holmes-Smith - backing vocals (selected dates)

Dancers
 Jenny Griffin – dance captain
 Katie Collins – dancer
 Shaun Niles – dancer
 Anders Neilsen – dancer
 Kane Horn – dancer
 Yves Cueni – dancer
 Jake Leigh – dancer
 Ben Hukin – dancer

Costumes
 Frank Strachan – costume stylist
 Sascha Lilic – fashion consultant
 Ralph & Russo – costume design
 Jitrois – costume design
 Gamba Shoes – costume design
 Paco Rabanne – costume design
 Stevie Stewart – costume design
 Rellik – costume design
 Kolchagov Barba – costume design
 Preciosa – crystal embellishments
 Deborah Tallentire – costume design
 Davida Helmets – costume design
 London Embroidery Studio – costume design
 Wrangler – costume design
 Alida Herbst – costume design
 Carine Gilson – costume design

Creative associates
 Ali Pike – associate lighting designer
 Jenny Griffin – associate choreographer
 Noel Jones, Peter Graham  – sound recording
 Nev Bull – video programmer
 Luke Rolls – draftsman
 Michael Al-Far – render artist
 Nicola Mills – storyline
 George Sinclair – creative producer

Visuals
 Blink Inc – video content
 Kirsten McFie – video content producer
 Paige Kauffman – US video content producer
 Thomas English – director of photography
 Edwin Eversole – director of photography
 Rupa Rathod – lead editor, motion graphics
 Richard Cullen – technical director
 Kevin Ramser – motion graphics
 Simon Davies – art director

Crew
 Kevin Pruce – FDH sound engineer
 Gavin Tempany – monitor engineer
 Will Sanderson – playback tech
 Nick Sizer – drum tech
 Mark 'McKinty' Gordon – guitar tech
 Phil Murphy – stage manager
 Lee Freeman – assistant stage manager
 Frank Strachan – wardrobe
 Anne-Marie Bigby – head of wardrobe
 Kerry West – assistant head of wardrobe
 Josh Thomas – RF tech
 Jonny Buck – audio crew tech
 Don Parks – system tech
 Beth O'Leary – monitor tech
 Mark O'Neill – PA
 Tom Gardener – PA
 Ali Pike – lighting operator
 Ben Cash – lighting programmer
 Aidan McCabe – lighting crew chief
 Jacob Black – lighting crew
 Michael Sanchez – lighting crew
 John Hetherton – lighting crew
 Matt Morris – lighting crew
 Jonty Rivers – zactrack
 Aaron Veness – zactrack
 Andy Joyes – video crew chief, LED tech
 Nev Bull – media server operator
 Briony Margetts – racks/system engineer
 Matt Peers – LED tech
 Lee Hunter – LED tech
 John Brandon – LED tech
 Chris Johnson – LED tech
 Matt Doughty – LED tech
 Matt Brown – camera operator
 Jamie Cowlin – camera operator
 Danny Sheldon – camera operator
 Seth Griffiths – lasers, special effects
 Bradley Saunders – lasers, special effects
 Andy Roberts – rigger
 Domonick Warrington – rigger, Kinesys
 Rick Worsfold – head carpenter
 Pete Geary – set carpenter
 Jackson Wheeler – set carpenter
 Jack Crane – set carpenter
 Charlie Pollington – physio
 David Lopez-Edwards – backstage filming
 Simon Raynor – catering
 Steffy Head – catering
 Lincoln Jefferson – catering
 Cherry Pashby – catering
 Stuart Butler – catering
 Eddie McQueen – catering
 Graham Brumhead – bus driver
 Richard Deane – bus driver
 Mike Fields – bus driver
 Ian Staveley – bus driver
 Tony Ackroyd – bus driver
 Kevin Watson – bus driver

Tour promoters
 Andy Copping – promotion
 Steve Horner – promotion
 Simon Moran – promotion
 Cathy Wilson – promotion
 Peter Aiken – promotion

Suppliers
 Graham Miller – video
 Matthew Ilott – lighting
 Ben Brookes – staging
 Matt Kaye – staging
 Ewan Ashburn – staging
 Wendy Deans – catering
 Robin Conway – sound
 Paul Timmins – sound
 Marc Webber – lasers, special effects
 Howard Eaton Lighting – props
 Lily Mollgaard – props
 Dave Simmons – props
 Lisa Buckley – props
 Andy Gray – bussing
 David Coumbe – trucking
 Matt Jackson – trucking
 Paul Walker – trucking
 Ian Patterson – travel
 Maria Taylor – travel
 Izzi Robinson – travel
 Tim Cox – accreditation
 Nigel Jones – legal
 David Cushion – accounting
 Lottie Prosser – accounting
 Rima Bavalia – accounting

References

Notes

Citations

2018 concert tours
2019 concert tours
2019 live albums
Kylie Minogue concert tours